Moontown Airport  is a privately owned public-use airport located seven nautical miles (13 km) east of the central business district of Huntsville, a city in Madison County, Alabama, United States.

Facilities and aircraft 
It has one runway designated 9/27 with a turf surface measuring 2,180 by 160 feet (664 x 49 m).

For the 12-month period ending April 22, 2009, the airport had 15,784 general aviation aircraft operations, an average of 43 per day. At that time there were 96 aircraft based at this airport: 86% single-engine, 2% multi-engine, 10% glider and 1% ultralight.

Moontown Airport is the home base for the Huntsville Chapter of the EAA (Experimental Aircraft Association) and the Huntsville Soaring Club.

References

External links 
 Moontown Airport, official website
 Airfield photos for 3M5 from Civil Air Patrol
 Huntsville Chapter EAA - Chapter 190, official website

Airports in Madison County, Alabama
Transportation in Huntsville, Alabama
Privately owned airports